The white-chinned sapphire (Chlorestes cyanus) is a species of hummingbird in the family Trochilidae.
It is found in northern South America.
Its natural habitats are subtropical or tropical moist lowland forest, subtropical or tropical dry shrubland, and heavily degraded former forest.

This species was formerly placed in the genus Hylocharis.  A molecular phylogenetic study published in 2014 found that Hylocharis was polyphyletic. In the revised classification to create monophyletic genera, the  white-chinned sapphire was moved to Chlorestes.

Description 
The male has a prussian blue head and is green with a red beak while the female is brown and white with a black beak.

References

white-chinned sapphire
Birds of Venezuela
Birds of the Guianas
Birds of the Amazon Basin
Birds of the Atlantic Forest
Hummingbird species of South America
white-chinned sapphire
Taxa named by Louis Jean Pierre Vieillot
Birds of Brazil
Taxonomy articles created by Polbot
Taxobox binomials not recognized by IUCN